Brett Sturgess was born 16 November 1981 in Kettering, England, Sturgess is a rugby union player for Exeter Chiefs in the Aviva Premiership whose position of choice is Prop. Sturgess has previously played for Irish side Connacht Rugby and English side Northampton Saints. Sturgess joined Exeter in 2007 from Connacht and has become a regular feature in the Exeter squad. Sturgess left the Chiefs at the end of the 2015–16 season.

References

External References
Exeter Chiefs profile

1981 births
Living people
English rugby union players
Exeter Chiefs players
Northampton Saints players
Rugby union players from Kettering
Rugby union props